Sonchus oleraceus is a species of flowering plant in the tribe Cichorieae of the family Asteraceae, native to Europe and Western Asia. It has many common names including common sowthistle, sow thistle, smooth sow thistle, annual sow thistle, hare's colwort, hare's thistle, milky tassel, milk thistle. and soft thistle.

Its specific epithet  means "vegetable/herbal". The common name 'sow thistle' refers to its attractiveness to pigs, and the similarity of the leaf to younger thistle plants. The common name 'hare's thistle' refers to its purported beneficial effects on hare and rabbits.

Botanical characteristics
This annual plant has a hollow, upright stem up to 30–100 cm high. It prefers full sun, and can tolerate most soil conditions. The flowers are hermaphroditic, and common pollinators include bees and flies. It spreads by seeds being carried by wind or water.

This plant is considered an invasive species in many parts of the world, where it is found mostly in disturbed areas.  In Australia it is a common and widespread invasive species, with large infestations a serious problem in crops.

Cuisine

Leaves are eaten as salad greens or cooked like spinach.  This is one of the species used in Chinese cuisine as kŭcài (苦菜; lit. bitter vegetable). The younger leaves are less bitter and better to eat raw. Steaming can remove the bitterness of older leaves. The younger roots are also edible and can suffice as a coffee substitute.

Nutritive qualities
Nutritional analysis reveals 30 – 40 mg of vitamin C per 100g, 1.2% protein, 0.3% fat, 2.4% carbohydrate. Leaf dry matter analysis per 100g (likely to vary with growing conditions) shows: 45g Carbohydrate, 28g protein, 22g ash, 5.9g fibre, 4.5g fat; in all, providing 265 calories.

Minerals

 Calcium: 1500 mg
 Phosphorus: 500 mg
 Iron: 45.6 mg
 Magnesium: 0 mg
 Sodium: 0 mg
 Potassium: 0 mg
 Zinc: 0 mg

Vitamins

 A: 35 mg
 Thiamine (B1): 1.5 mg
 Riboflavin (B2): 5 mg
 Niacin: 5 mg
 B6: 0 mg
 C: 60 mg

Herbalism

Sonchus oleraceus has a variety of uses in herbalism. It also has been ascribed medicinal qualities similar to dandelion and succory. The early Māori people of New Zealand are likely to have gathered it for food and medical use.

Native Americans had many uses for this plant. Pima used its gum as a "cure for the opium habit," as a cathartic, and as a food, where the "{l}eaves and stems {were} rubbed between the palms of the hands and eaten raw" and sometimes "boiled." The Yaqui used the plant as a vegetable, where the "{t}ender, young leaves boiled in salted water with chile and eaten as greens." The Kamia (Kumeyaay) "boiled {the} leaves {and} used {it} for food as greens." The {Houma} used it as an abortifacient where an "{i}nfusion of {the} plant {was} taken to 'make tardy menstruation come;'" an antidiarrheal; for children that were teething; and as hog feed.

Control
This plant can often be controlled by mowing, because it does not regrow from root fragments. Attempts at weed control by herbicide, to the neglect of other methods, may have led to proliferation of this species in some environments.

References
Footnotes

Citations

External links

Tropicos.org: photo of herbarium specimen at Missouri Botanical Garden
Tropicos.org: line drawing from Flora of Panama
Nature Manitoba: Annual Sow-thistle (Sonchus oleraceus) — photos, drawings, & text from Wild Plants of Winnipeg.

oleraceus
Flora of Asia
Flora of Europe
Edible plants
Leaf vegetables
Medicinal plants
Plants described in 1753
Taxa named by Carl Linnaeus
Flora naturalised in Australia